Graniczna Wieś  is a village in the administrative district of Gmina Trąbki Wielkie, within Gdańsk County, Pomeranian Voivodeship, in northern Poland.

The village has a population of 252.

The name of the village means "boundary village".

During the Second World War, in 1939–1941, Graniczna Wieś was the site of the Grenzdorf subcamp of the Stutthof concentration camp, in which the Germans subjected hundreds of people to forced labour. Many Poles from Gdańsk died in the subcamp.

References

Villages in Gdańsk County
Holocaust locations in Poland